Ioannis Fakas (born ) is a retired Greek male volleyball player and the current assistant coach of the Greek powerhouse Olympiacos. He has 109 appearances with Greece men's national volleyball team. He played for Olympiacos for 12 years (1983-1995), winning 8 Greek Championships and 6 Greek Cups.

Clubs
  Olympiacos (1983-1995)

References

External links
 Giannis Fakas interview at greekvolley.com (Greek)

1964 births
Living people
Greek men's volleyball players
Olympiacos S.C. players
Sportspeople from Ioannina